Jeffrey Thomas DeGraff (born 1958) is an American professor, professional speaker, author, and consultant. He is known for his contribution and development work on the Competing Values Framework, a model about understanding how to appreciate conflicting values and integrate them successfully so that an organization is open to collaboration and growth. He is a consultant to executive teams at Fortune 500 companies, assessing the company's capabilities around innovation and their prospects of growing the business. DeGraff is also a professor at the Ross School of Business at the University of Michigan.

Early life
DeGraff was born in Kalamazoo, Michigan, United States, the second of five children. He holds a B. S. in Communication Arts and Sciences and a teaching certificate from Western Michigan University (1980), an M.A. in Communication and Information Studies from the University of Michigan (1982, Lloyd Hall Fellowship), and a Ph.D. in Educational Technology from the University of Wisconsin-Madison (1985).

Career
Rejoining the faculty at the Ross School of Business at the University of Michigan, DeGraff was the Vice President of Communications and New Ventures for Domino's Pizza (1985-1990). 

After five years at Domino's Pizza, Professor Robert Quinn recruited DeGraff to join the faculty at the Ross School of Business at the University of Michigan to develop and teach a series of graduate courses on leading creativity and innovation. Today he is a top rated Professor of Management and Organizations for the school, having received the University of Michigan's 2011 Voices of the Staff award.

In June 2011, DeGraff hosted a national PBS television show about leading innovation, called Innovation You.

References

External links
 Official website
 Competingvalues.com
 Execed.bus.umich.edu
 Innovatrium.org
 Innovationyou.com
 Jeff DeGraff - BigSpeak.com Keynote Speaker Bio

1958 births
Living people
American business theorists
University of Michigan alumni
American educators